A dipole magnet is the simplest type of magnet. It has two poles, one north and one south. Its magnetic field lines form simple closed loops which emerge from the north pole, re-enter at the south pole, then pass through the body of the magnet. The simplest example of a dipole magnet is a bar magnet.

Dipole magnets in accelerators

In particle accelerators, a  dipole magnet is the electromagnet used to create a homogeneous magnetic field over some distance. Particle motion in that field will be circular in a plane perpendicular to the field and collinear to the direction of particle motion and free in the direction orthogonal to it.
Thus, a particle injected into a dipole magnet will travel on a circular or helical trajectory. By adding several dipole sections on the same plane, the bending radial effect of the beam increases.

In accelerator physics, dipole magnets are used to realize bends in the design trajectory (or 'orbit') of the particles, as in circular accelerators. Other uses include:
 Injection of particles into the accelerator
 Ejection of particles from the accelerator
 Correction of orbit errors
 Production of synchrotron radiation

The force on a charged particle in a particle accelerator from a dipole magnet can be described by the Lorentz force law, where a charged particle experiences a force of 
 
(in SI units). In the case of a particle accelerator dipole magnet, the charged particle beam is bent via the cross product of the particle's velocity and the magnetic field vector, with direction also being dependent on the charge of the particle.

The amount of force that can be applied to a charged particle by a dipole magnet is one of the limiting factors for modern synchrotron and cyclotron proton and ion accelerators. As the energy of the accelerated particles increases, they require more force to change direction and require larger B fields to be steered. Limitations on the amount of B field that can be produced with modern dipole electromagnets require synchrotrons/cyclotrons to increase in size (thus increasing the number of dipole magnets used) to compensate for increases in particle velocity. In the largest modern synchrotron, the Large Hadron Collider, there are 1232 main dipole magnets used for bending the path of the particle beam, each weighing 35 metric tons.

Other uses
Other uses of dipole magnets to deflect moving particles include isotope mass measurement in mass spectrometry, and particle momentum measurement in particle physics.

Such magnets are also used in traditional televisions, which contain a cathode ray tube, which is essentially a small particle accelerator. Their magnets are called deflecting coils. The magnets move a single spot on the screen of the TV tube in a controlled way all over the screen.

See also
 Accelerator physics
 Beam line
 Cyclotron
 Electromagnetism
 Linear particle accelerator
 Particle accelerator
 Quadrupole magnet
 Sextupole magnet
 Multipole magnet
 Storage ring

References

External links

Types of magnets
Accelerator physics